Events from the year 1577 in India.

Events
 Raja Narsingh Deo rule of the Patna kingdom comes to an end (began 1570)
 Raja Hamir Deo begines rule of the Patna kingdom (continues until 1581)

Births

Deaths

See also

 Timeline of Indian history

References